In organic synthesis, aminochlorination is a reaction that installs both a chlorine atom and an amino (or amido) group to give an 2-aminoalkyl chloride.  The reaction typically is effected by combining alkene substrates with chloramines.  An alternative implementation involves Pd(II)-induced nucleophilic attack of the amine on the alkene followed by oxidation by a cupric chloride.

References

Organic synthesis